The Red scarf is a symbol of the international Pioneer Movement.

Red scarf may also refer to:

Red Scarf (company), a lifestyle website aimed at Chinese citizens resident in the UK
Red Scarf (film), a 1964 South Korean aviation action film set during the Korean War
Red scarf, a plain red scarf depicted in the song and short film "All Too Well" by Taylor Swift
, a theme song of the movie, Till We Meet Again, sung by WeiBird, released on November 5, 2021

See also
The Girl with the Red Scarf, a 1978 Turkish film
The Girl with the Red Scarf (TV series), a 2011-2012 Turkish television series
Red Scarf Girl, an English language memoir of the Cultural Revolution
Honglingjin Park, also known as Red Scarf Park, a park in Beijing